Jongejan and Jongejans are Dutch surnames meaning "young John('s)". The name  originated to distinguish a younger family member "Jan" from a senior one, like a father or an older brother. The latter was not uncommon; Dutch convention was to name the two oldest sons after each grandfather, who may both have been called "Jan". The common surname De Jong has a similar origin. Notable people with these surnames include:

Ben Jongejan (born 1985), Dutch speed skater
Daphne Jongejans (born 1965), Dutch springboard diver, sister of Edwin
Edwin Jongejans (born 1966), Dutch springboard diver, brother of Daphne
Ferenc Jongejan (born 1978), Dutch baseball player
George Jongejans (1917–2016), American singer, actor and voice artist known as "George Gaynes"

References

Dutch-language surnames